Whirled Peas was a surf music band formed in 1992, in Austin, Texas, USA. Its name was taken from a bumper sticker reading "Visualize World Peace", which they twisted into "Visualize Whirled Peas". This led to bumper stickers with this phrase on it instead. The band released two albums in the mid-1990s, and played the Austin music scene before breaking up in 1996.

History 
Members of the band first met at an Austin apartment complex in summer 1992. Robert Hembrook had just finished his service in the Army and was moving into Sandstone Apartments east of the University of Texas campus. George Pestana was living in the apartment complex and offered to help Hembrook move in. Part of Hembrook's belongings included a bass guitar and amplifier. Pestana mentioned that he was a drummer and that he knew a guitarist, Christoph Borst. Pestana suggested they all meet up to play and start a band. Hembrook had access to the Geology 100 Lecture hall on the campus, so that became their rehearsal space through late 1992. The style favored more metal, led by Borst. These early efforts, along with attempts to add a second guitarist, did not gel, so Borst suggested the rhythm section continue with another guitarist, Ted James, who might fit better stylistically.

James started his first band, Rattletrap, in 1992, playing bass guitar. He moved to Austin in October 1992 from Huntsville, Alabama. He was a huge fan of surf music, a style made popular in the 1960-1965 time frame by artists such as Duane Eddy, The Ventures and Dick Dale and the Deltones.

James brought several arrangements to the band, and they began working on such tunes as Dick Dale's "Misirlou". Coincidentally, that tune was used to open Quentin Tarantino's movie Pulp Fiction. The band hoped that releasing it as a single would lead to some local success, but initial cassette and vinyl releases were met with little fanfare.

James was the songwriting force behind the band, bringing in the basic chord sheets and working out leads. Hembrook and Pestana arranged their own parts. Hembrook took on the role of frontman, introducing the songs and providing chatter between songs, while changing instruments or tuning, etc.

Studio work began on the first recording. This was released on cassette in 1993 as "Visualize Me Baby!". The recording was done by Hembrook, using rented equipment in a spacious North Austin practice space. The initial run of cassettes was sold at local gigs and attempts were made to sell them through local indie record stores.

In 1994, the band went to Snooty Fox Studios in South Austin to record ten songs for what became War and Peas. War and Peas was recorded on 16 track ADAT, with 4 tracks for drums, one each for bass guitar and guitar (dry) with additional tracks open for guitar effects and vocals. Jennifer Summers was featured on a vocal arrangement of the Daniel Johnston song "Walking the Cow". This song, along with the REM cover "White Tornado" and Whirled Peas original "Loungitude", appeared on a compilation album mainly of songs originally by The Replacements called The Fans Hit Back in 1994.

Reviews of the Whirled Peas portions of the tape were favorable. Mark Timmins, in The Skyway e-zine, wrote, "Ted feels that since his band Whirled Peas performs primarily sans vocalist, and that since every band covers an REM song at least once during their career, they thought they should record "White Tornado."  Whirled Peas' rendition of this instrumental by the band from Georgia is included. "Driver 8" without vocals just wouldn't cut it, I guess.... Their proclivity toward instrumentals notwithstanding, the band also offer up a rendition of the Daniel Johnston classic "Walking the Cow," featuring Jenifer Sanders on vocals. A Whirled Peas original, "Loungitude," rounds out the roster of their songs included on this tape. I get nightclub jitters just listening to it.

War & Peas did not sell well in the blues-dominated Austin music scene. Whirled Peas continued to gig in Austin, supporting various members of the instrumental/surf/ska-punk scene. They had showcases at an out of the way venue during SXSW, and had opening gigs for a number of similar instrumental and rockabilly bands.

James and Hembrook also played with the short-lived Austin "supergroup" called Selma, which made a recording of the Uncle Tupelo song "New Madrid".

In March 1995, Pestana moved to Dallas. James and Hembrook decided to give up. James went on to found instrumental bands such as Squid Vicious, Johnny Vortex and The Nematoads. Hembrook and Pestana reunited in 1998 to form the rhythm section of Id, Ego, Superego which played South By Southwest in 1998 and broke up soon after. Pestana later played on and off with James, and currently drums with The Nematoads.

Discography
 Visualize Me Baby (1993)
 War & Peas (1994)

References 

Musical groups established in 1992
Musical groups from Austin, Texas
Musical groups disestablished in 1996
1992 establishments in Texas